Kent Township may refer to the following townships in the United States:

 Kent Township, Warren County, Indiana
 Kent Township, Stephenson County, Illinois